The 2022 West Lothian Council election took place on 5 May 2022. Elected positions in all 9 wards created as a result of the Local Governance (Scotland) Act 2004 were up for election, with each ward electing three or four Councillors using the single transferable vote (STV) system form of proportional representation, with 33 Councillors being elected in total.

Background

2017 results

 

 

Following the 2017 West Lothian Council election, the Labour and Conservative groups worked together in the chamber to hold a majority, although both parties denied this claim. This agreement led to Cllr Lawrence Fitzpatrick being appointed Council Leader and Conservative Cllr Tom Kerr was appointed Provost of West Lothian.

There were two by-elections in 2021 which saw each main party field candidates. The Livingston South by-election held in March 2021 following the retirement of SNP Cllr Peter Johnston resulted in the SNP retaining the seat. Meanwhile in the October 2021 East Livingston and East Calder by-election which was called following the death of Labour Cllr Dave King resulted in a gain for the SNP. In the weeks following the by-election Labour Cllr Angela Doran-Timson joined the Conservatives.

In November 2021, SNP Councillors tabled a motion of no-confidence against Cllr Fitzpatrick's administration. The motion failed following support from the Conservatives.

Retiring Councillors 

SNP Councillor Frank Anderson was deselected by his party. He announced that he would stand as an Independent candidate in East Livingston and East Calder.

Candidates standing

Results

Ward summary

|- class="unsortable" align="centre"
!rowspan=2 align="left"|Ward
!% 
!Cllrs
!%
!Cllrs
!%
!Cllrs
!%
!Cllrs
!%
!Cllrs
!%
!Cllrs
!rowspan=2|TotalCllrs
|- class="unsortable" align="center"
!colspan=2 bgcolor="" |SNP
!colspan=2 bgcolor="" |Lab
!colspan=2 bgcolor="" |Green
!colspan=2 bgcolor=""|Conservative
!colspan=2 bgcolor="" |Lib Dem
!colspan=2 bgcolor="white"|Others
|-
|align="left"|Linlithgow
|bgcolor="" |26.26
|bgcolor="" |1
|19.54
|1
|13.22
|0
|19.83
|0
|20.33
|1
|0.33
|0
|3
|-
|align="left"|Broxburn, Uphall and Winchburgh
|bgcolor="" |41.88
|bgcolor="" |2
|29.61
|1
|4.35
|0
|17.73
|1
|3.72
|0
|2.71
|0
|4
|-
|align="left"|Livingston North
|bgcolor="" |48.60
|bgcolor="" |2
|23.75
|1
|4.48
|0
|20.68
|1
|3.85
|0
|1.95
|0
|4
|-
|align="left"|Livingston South
|bgcolor="" |38.99
|bgcolor="" |2
|32.38
|1
|4.34
|0
|11.68
|1
|2.21
|0
|10.40
|0
|4
|-
|align="left"|East Livingston and East Calder
|bgcolor="" |41.79
|bgcolor="" |2
|21.12
|1
|6.62
|0
|18.29
|1
|3.31
|0
|8.87
|0
|4
|-
|align="left"|Fauldhouse and the Briech Valley
|38.33
|1
|bgcolor="" |40.16
|bgcolor="" |2
|3.65
|0
|14.16
|0
|2.33
|0
|1.38
|0
|3
|-
|align="left"|Whitburn and Blackburn
|bgcolor="" |38.62
|bgcolor="" |2
|37.37
|2
|3.10
|0
|18.50
|0
|2.41
|0
|colspan="2" 
|4
|-
|align="left"|Bathgate
|bgcolor="" |40.42
|bgcolor="" |2
|38.73
|2
|3.79
|0
|14.14
|0
|2.02
|0
|0.90
|0
|4
|-
|align="left"|Armadale and Blackridge
|22.05
|1
|14.12
|1
|2.59
|0
|10.56
|0
|0.95
|0
|bgcolor=""|49.73
|bgcolor=""|1
|3
|-
|- class="unsortable" class="sortbottom"
!align="left"|Total
!37.86
!15
!28.57
!12
!5.27
!0
!12.12
!4
!4.78
!1
!7.61
!1
!33
|}

Wards

Linlithgow 

 2012: 1 x Conservative, 1 x SNP, 1 x Labour
 2017: 1 x Conservative, 1 x SNP, 1 x Labour
 2022: 1 x SNP, 1 x Labour, 1 x Liberal Democrat
 2017-2022 Change: 1 x Liberal Democrat gain from Conservative

Broxburn, Uphall and Winchburgh 

 2012: 2 x Labour, 2 x SNP
 2017: 2 x SNP, 1 x Labour, 1 x Conservative
 2022: 2 x SNP, 1 x Labour, 1 x Conservative
 2017-2022 Change: No Change

Livingston North 

 2012: 2 x SNP, 2 x Labour
 2017: 2 x SNP, 1 x Labour, 1 x Conservative
 2022: 2 x SNP, 1 x Labour, 1 x Conservative
 2017-2022 Change: No Change

Livingston South 

 2012: 2 x Labour, 2 x SNP
 2017: 2 x SNP, 1 x Labour, 1 x Conservative
 2021 (by-election): 2 x SNP, 1 x Labour, 1 x Conservative
 2022: 2 x SNP, 1 x Labour, 1 x Conservative
 2017-2022 Change: No Change

East Livingston and East Calder 

 2012: 2 x Labour, 2 x SNP
 2017: 2 x SNP, 1 x Labour, 1 x Conservative
 2021 (by-election): 3 x SNP, 1 x Conservative
 2022: 2 x SNP, 1 x Labour, 1 x Conservative
 2017-2022 Change: No Change

Fauldhouse and the Briech Valley 

 2012: 2 x Labour, 1 x SNP
 2017: 2 x Labour, 1 x SNP
 2022: 2 x Labour, 1 x SNP
 2017-2022 Change: No Change

Whitburn and Blackburn 

 2012: 2 x Labour, 2 x SNP
 2017: 2 x Labour, 1 x SNP, 1 x Conservative
 2022: 2 x Labour, 2 x SNP
 2017-2022 Change: 1 x SNP gain from Conservative

Bathgate 

 2012: 2 x Labour, 2 x SNP
 2017: 2xLabour; 1 x SNP; 1 x Conservative
 2022: 2 x Labour, 2 x SNP 
2017-2022 Change: 1 x SNP gain from Conservative

Armadale and Blackridge 

 2012: 1 x Independent, 1 x Labour, 1 x SNP
 2017: 1 x Independent, 1 x Labour, 1 x SNP
 2022: 1 x Independent, 1 x Labour, 1 x SNP
 2017-2022 Change: No Change

Aftermath
Although the SNP won the most seats, Labour were chosen to run the council after doing a deal with the Conservatives. The council resembles the set up after the previous election, with Labour running a minority administration with loose coalition support from the four Conservative councillors, the Independent Stuart Borrowman and Liberal Democrat, Sally Pattle.

In response to the announcement, former Labour councillor and MSP Neil Findlay, who represented Fauldhouse and the Briech Valley from 2003 to 2012, called his own party "shameful [for] voting Tories into office", saying the Conservatives were "the enemy of my class".

Notes

References

West Lothian
West Lothian Council elections